The Râncăciov is a left tributary of the river Argeș in Romania. It discharges into the Argeș near Catanele. It flows through the towns and villages Valea Corbului, Cârstieni, Urlucea and Râncăciov.

References

Rivers of Romania
Rivers of Argeș County